The 2011–12 season was Kilmarnock's thirteenth consecutive season in the Scottish Premier League, having competed in it since its inauguration in 1998–99. Kilmarnock also competed in the League Cup and the Scottish Cup.

Summary

Kilmarnock finished seventh in the Scottish Premier League with 47 points. They reached the fifth round of the Scottish Cup, losing to Hibernian and won the League Cup for the first time in their history after a 1–0 victory over Celtic at Hampden.

Results and fixtures

Pre-season

Scottish Premier League

Scottish League Cup

Scottish Cup

Player statistics

Captains

Squad
Last updated 13 May 2012

 

|-
|colspan="8"|Players who left the club during the 2010–11 season
|-

   
  
 

|}

Disciplinary record
Includes all competitive matches. 
Last updated 13 May 2012

Team statistics

League table

Transfers

Players In

Players Out

Notes and references

External links
 Kilmarnock F.C. website
 BBC My Club page

2011andndash;12
Kilmarnock